Transactional sex refers to sexual relationships where the giving and/or receiving of gifts, money or other services is an important factor. The participants do not necessarily frame themselves in terms of prostitutes/clients, but often as girlfriends/boyfriends, or sugar babies/sugar daddies. Those offering sex may or may not feel affection for their partners.

Transactional sex is a superset of sex work, in that the exchange of monetary reward for sex includes a broader set of (usually non-marital) obligations that do not necessarily involve a predetermined payment or gift, but where there is a definite motivation to benefit materially from the sexual exchange.

See also 
Casting couch
 Enjo kōsai
 Hypergamy
 Kept woman
Prostitution among animals
 Sex for fish
 Sugar baby
 Treating (dating)

References

Further reading 
 Chatterji, Minki; Murray, Nancy;  London, David and Anglewicz. Philip The Factors Influencing Transactional Sex Among Young Men and Women in 12 Sub-Saharan African Countries, POLICY Project, October 2004. (pdf)
 
 Epstein, Helen. "The Fidelity Fix", first published in the New York Times, June 13, 2004
 
 

 
  
 
 Luke, N.; Kurz, K. Cross-generational and transactional sexual relations in Sub-Saharan Africa: prevalence of behavior and implications for negotiating safer sexual practices. International Center for Research on Women (ICRW), USA, 2002. (pdf)